1072 Malva, provisional designation , is a dark background asteroid from the outer regions of the asteroid belt, approximately 48 kilometers in diameter. It was discovered on 4 October 1926, by astronomer Karl Reinmuth at the Heidelberg-Königstuhl State Observatory in Germany. The asteroid was named after the flowering plant Malva (mallow).

Orbit and classification 

Malva is a non-family asteroid from the main belt's background population. It orbits the Sun in the outer asteroid belt at a distance of 2.4–3.9 AU once every 5 years and 8 months (2,057 days; semi-major axis of 3.17 AU). Its orbit has an eccentricity of 0.24 and an inclination of 8° with respect to the ecliptic. The body's observation arc begins with its official discovery observation at Heidelberg in October 1926.

Physical characteristics 

Malva is an assumed C-type asteroid.

Rotation period 

Observations performed by Brian Warner at the Palmer Divide Observatory in Colorado Springs, Colorado, during 2007 produced a lightcurve with a period of 10.080 ± 0.005 hours and a brightness range of 0.17 ± 0.02 in magnitude. Another lightcurve obtained by Italian amateur astronomers Roberto Crippa and Federico Manzini at the Sozzago Astronomical Station gave a period of 9.0127 hours with an amplitude of 0.17 magnitude.

Diameter and albedo 

According to the surveys carried out by the Infrared Astronomical Satellite IRAS, the Japanese Akari satellite and the NEOWISE mission of NASA's Wide-field Infrared Survey Explorer, Malva measures between 45.05 and 53.675 kilometers in diameter and its surface has an albedo between 0.032 and 0.0549.

The Collaborative Asteroid Lightcurve Link derives an albedo of 0.0458 and a diameter of 44.97 kilometers based on an absolute magnitude of 10.7.

Naming 

This minor planet was named after the genus of flowering plants, Malva, also known as mallow. The official naming citation was mentioned in The Names of the Minor Planets by Paul Herget in 1955.

Reinmuth's flowers 

Due to his many discoveries, Karl Reinmuth submitted a large list of 66 newly named asteroids in the early 1930s.

Notes

References

External links 
 (1072) Malva, summary at AstDys-2
 Asteroid Lightcurve Database (LCDB), query form (info )
 Dictionary of Minor Planet Names, Google books
 Asteroids and comets rotation curves, CdR – Observatoire de Genève, Raoul Behrend
 Discovery Circumstances: Numbered Minor Planets (1)-(5000) – Minor Planet Center
 
 

001072
Discoveries by Karl Wilhelm Reinmuth
Named minor planets
19261004